Motto Pictures is a documentary production company based in Brooklyn, New York specializing in producing and executive producing documentary features. Motto secures financing, builds distribution strategies, and creatively develops films, and has produced over 25 feature documentaries and won numerous awards.

History
Motto Pictures was founded in 2009 by Julie Goldman and Christopher Clements (producer), Emmy and Peabody Award-winning producers of documentary feature films.

Films

References

Documentary film production companies
Film production companies of the United States